David John Kukulka is a professor and inventor in mechanical engineering and technology. He has numerous patents and travels globally to collaborate on  his findings and knowledge in thermal dynamics. In 2017 he received the Chancellors Award for Creativity from The State University of New York. He received his PhD and undergraduate degrees from the University at Buffalo and continues to teach in the SUNY system.

More recently Kukulka has experimented with tubular manipulation of various metals for thermal-industrial needs. His work with Rigidized Metals of Buffalo, New York, headed by legacy owner Richard Smith, to creative solar water ferries  for the Buffalo Harbor and his other accomplishments include working with ExxonMobil and Coca-Cola to reduce product to market costs for consumers. Kukulka also consulted on the new design of the Technology Building at Buffalo State College.

References

 

Year of birth missing (living people)
Living people
State University of New York faculty
University at Buffalo alumni